Star Peak can refer to:
Star Peak (Colorado)
Star Peak (Nevada), the highest and most topographically prominent mountain in the Humboldt Range and Pershing County, Nevada.
Star Peak Group, geologic group in Nevada named for the peak.
Star Peak (Washington), a summit in the North Cascades